Ethmia albicostella is a moth in the family Depressariidae. It is a widespread species in the Rocky Mountains and Sierra Madre Occidental of Mexico, ranging from southern Manitoba, Saskatchewan, and Montana through the southern Rocky Mountain states at moderately high elevations and mountains of western Mexico at least south to Durango.

The ground color of the forewings is divided by a straight longitudinal line. The costal half is dark to pale brownish gray, darkest at the dividing line, blending to whitish at the costa. The dorsal area is white, lightly tinged with grayish and marked by a single small, oblong, dark spot at the basal one-fourth. The ground color of the hindwings is pale brownish, but slightly darker apically. Adults are on wing from mid June to early August.

The larvae feed on Lithospermum species.

References

Moths described in 1889
albicostella